Floorball at the 2015 Southeast Asian Games was held in ITE College Central, Singapore from 9 to 14 June 2015. Medals were awarded in one disciplines for both men and women competitions.

Participating nations
A total of 136 athletes from four nations will be competing in floorball at the 2015 Southeast Asian Games:

Competition schedule
The following is the competition schedule for the floorball competitions:

Medalists

Medal table

Final standing

Men

Women

References

External links
 

 
Floorball competitions
Floorball in Asia
Southeast Asian Games
2015 Southeast Asian Games events